Clara Huete Sánchez  (born 15 April 2002), also known as  Clara Galle, is a Spanish actress and model. She is best known for her lead role as Raquel in Through My Window (2022)..

Early life 
Clara Huete Sánchez was born in Pamplona  Spain. From an early age Galle showed interest in acting where she studied performing at Plaza de la Cruz Institute.

Career
In October 2021, Galle starred the videoclip of Sebastián Yatra's single "Tacones Rojos".

Galle debuts as Raquel Mendoza as the main female lead of Through My Window in 2022. The same year, Galle starred in The Boarding School: Las Cumbres as Eva Merino.

Filmography

Film

Television

Music video

References

External links 
 

2002 births
Living people
21st-century Spanish actresses
People from Pamplona
Spanish female models
Spanish television actresses
Actresses from Navarre